The Saint Jacob of Nsibin Syriac Orthodox Cathedral is a Syriac Orthodox cathedral in Södertälje, Sweden, located at Hovsjö Industrial Park and governed by the Syriac-Orthodox Archdiocese of Scandinavia. Metropolitan Mor Julius Abdulahad Gallo Shabo resides there. Construction begun in October 2007, and the church was opened on 17 May 2009.

References

Cathedrals in Sweden
Churches completed in 2009
Södertälje
Syriac Orthodox cathedrals
Oriental Orthodox cathedrals in Europe
Oriental Orthodoxy in Sweden